Leah Kauffman (born c. 1986) is an American singer and songwriter who is responsible for singing and writing popular viral videos, including "My Box in a Box",  "I Got a Crush... on Obama", "Obama Girl vs. Giuliani Girl", "I Like a Boy", and "Bernie Bae". The first song was written by Kauffman, the second and third were co-written by Kauffman and Ben Relles. Kauffman does not appear in the videos, instead actresses lip sync to her vocals. Most recently, Kauffman wrote and performed the song "Perfected: The Ann Coulter Song", the video of which features Kauffman, rather than a lip-syncing stand-in, for the first time.

Kauffman was born in Abington Township, Pennsylvania, and is a 2004 graduate of Abington Senior High School. She majored in magazine journalism at Temple University. In 2014, she was the Executive Producer of Philly.com's Lifestyle & Entertainment verticals.

References

External links 

LeahKauffman.com
Leah Kauffman on MySpace
Perfect me, Ann Coulter by Leah Kauffman

1986 births
Living people
People from Abington Township, Montgomery County, Pennsylvania
American women pop singers
American parodists
American satirists
Parody musicians
21st-century American women singers
Women satirists
21st-century American singers